Ghulam Rasool Sahi (born 9 July 1944) is a Pakistani politician who has been a member of the National Assembly of Pakistan, from 2002 to 2007 and again from June 2013 to May 2018.

Early life
He was born on 9 July 1944. in Faisalabad. He received his education from Faisalabad and later joined Pakistan Army. He participated in the 1971 Indo-Pakistan war. He retired as a Lieutenant Colonel.

Political career
He was elected to the National Assembly of Pakistan as a candidate of Pakistan Muslim League (Q) (PML-Q) from Constituency NA-75 (Faisalabad-I) in 2002 Pakistani general election. He received 55,464 votes and defeated Wajid Mustafa Bajwa, a candidate of Pakistan Peoples Party (PPP).

He ran for the seat of the National Assembly as a candidate of PML-Q from Constituency NA-75 (Faisalabad-I) in 2008 Pakistani general election but was unsuccessful. He received 68,196 votes and lost the seat to Tariq Mahmood Bajwa.

He was re-elected to the National Assembly as a candidate of Pakistan Muslim League (N) (PML-N) from Constituency NA-75 (Faisalabad-I) in 2013 Pakistani general election. He received 130,300 votes and defeated Fawad Ahmad Cheema, a candidate of Pakistan Tehreek-e-Insaf.

In May 2018, he quit PML-N and resigned from the National Assembly.

References

Living people
1944 births
Pakistani MNAs 2002–2007
Pakistani MNAs 2013–2018
Pakistan Muslim League (Q) MNAs
Pakistan Muslim League (N) MNAs
Punjabi people
Ghulam Rasool